There are multiple uses of the term The Torture Papers:
 The Torture Papers (book) is a book about the use of controversial techniques in the interrogation and detention of captives of the US.
 The Torture Papers (album) is the 2006 debut album from Hip Hop collective Army of the Pharaohs.